The M10 smoke tank, also known as Smoke Curtain Installation, was an aircraft under wing tank used by the United States Army Air Forces to lay smoke screens or dispense chemical weapons such as tear gas.

The tanks were used to lay aerial smoke screens in combat during the airdrop of the US Army's 503rd Parachute Infantry Regiment paratroopers at Nadzab, New Guinea in 1943.

References
 https://web.archive.org/web/20100802224218/http://www.nationalmuseum.af.mil/factsheets/factsheet.asp?id=1028

External links
Imperial War Museum website

Aircraft weapons
Chemical weapon delivery systems
Chemical weapons of the United States